Jenny is a 1962 Australian TV drama.

It was a rare early Australian television play to focus on teenagers.

Plot
Jenny is a 16-year-old girl whose father Roger, an actor, and mother Margaret, a television personality, have been separated for 15 months.  Jenny has a boyfriend, Michael, a law student.

Margaret tells Jenny she has met a Melbourne businessman, Rex Porter, that she wants to marry.

This sends Jenny out looking for her father and boyfriend. She winds up at a party at Kings Cross being held by beatniks.

She gets a cab driver to take her to The Gap where she intends on committing suicide. However the cab driver talks her out of it and takes Jenny home to her father.

Roger returns and he and Margaret realise how troubled Jenny is. They decide to try again for her sake.

Cast
Carolyn Keely as Jenny
Joan Winchester as Margaret Playford
James Condon as Roger Playford
Grant Taylor as Rex Porter
David Yorston as Michael
Lex Mitchell as the beatnik
Tony Carere, Joan Morrow and Kerry Collins as beatniks

Hunger of a Girl
The play appears to be based on a stage play written by Kerr called Hunger of a Girl. This was set in the Blue Mountains and was about a 17-year-old girl whose parents are separated and who reacts badly when her mother falls for another man. It results in the girl killing the other man.

This play was sponsored by the Elizabethan Theatre Trust and produced by the North Sydney Independent in September 1960 with Leonard Teale and Joan Winchester.

The Sydney Morning Herald called the play "commendably smooth" but felt it became contrived in the second act.

Production
It was the first of a series of six Australian plays to be produced by the ABC in 1962. The other five were:
Boy Round the Corner
The House of Mancello
Funnel Web
The Teeth of the Wind
The Hobby Horse

Patricia Hooker worked as script assistant.

Reception
A critic from the Sunday Sydney Morning Herald called it "first rate drama" until the last five minutes when "it collapsed into nothingness" because it left unanswered the central question, namely "Should the partners of an unsuccessful marriage forgo their own chances of happiness for the sake of their children?... Did author Kerr simply throw up his hands and give the whole thing away?"

The critic from the Sydney Morning Herald said "the play had all the searing truth and genuine emotion of a piece of eminently marketable woman's magazine fiction."

See also
List of television plays broadcast on Australian Broadcasting Corporation (1960s)

References

External links

1962 television plays
1960s Australian television plays
Australian Broadcasting Corporation original programming
Black-and-white Australian television shows
English-language television shows